Svetlana Kuznetsova was the two-time defending champion, but withdrew before the tournament began.

Julia Görges won her first title since 2011, defeating Daria Kasatkina in the final 6–1, 6–2.

Seeds
The top four seeds received a bye into the second round.

Draw

Finals

Top half

Bottom half

Qualifying

Seeds

Qualifiers

Draw

First qualifier

Second qualifier

Third qualifier

Fourth qualifier

References

External links
 Main draw
 Qualifying draw

2017 WTA Tour
2017 Women's Singles